Dylewo  is a village in the administrative district of Gmina Kadzidło, within Ostrołęka County, Masovian Voivodeship, in east-central Poland.

The village has a population of 1,352.

References

Villages in Ostrołęka County
Łomża Governorate
Warsaw Voivodeship (1919–1939)